Scuttle may refer to:

Scuttling, the deliberate sinking of one's own ship
Scuttle or sidescuttle, a synonym for a porthole, a circular window in a ship.
Coal scuttle, a bucket-like container for coal
Shaving scuttle, a teapot-like container for hot water
Scuttle, a fictional character in Disney's The Little Mermaid
Scuttle (software), web-based collaborative bookmarking software
Scuttle, the bulkhead in a vehicle between the engine and the driver and passengers
Scuttle shake, a phenomenon experienced in some convertible cars
Scuttle (Disney), a character in Disney's Mickey Mouse comics
 Scuttle (horse)

See also
Scuttler (disambiguation)
Scuttlebutt